McDaniel is an unincorporated community in Talbot County, Maryland, United States. McDaniel is located along Maryland Route 33, south of Claiborne and a short distance east of the Chesapeake Bay.

References

Unincorporated communities in Talbot County, Maryland
Unincorporated communities in Maryland
Maryland populated places on the Chesapeake Bay